The  is a Japanese air defense weapon built around the Oerlikon 35 mm twin cannon system as used on the Gepard self-propelled anti-aircraft gun. The system uses a modified Type 74 tank chassis. It is also nicknamed by field officers as "Guntank" after the similar-looking mecha in the Mobile Suit Gundam series.

History
As the JSDF began to seek a replacement for the M42 Duster SPAAGs provided by the United States, the Japanese Defense Agency began to issue requirements for the production of a local SPAAG unit to replace the M42. Mitsubishi Heavy Industries had been eventually awarded the contract to produce a SPAAG unit to replace its old M42s.

Development
It had been developed in 1987, given the Type 87 designation status, with Mitsubishi Heavy Industries providing the chassis and Japan Steel Works providing the cannon system. Initially, the chassis of the Type 61 tank would be used. Later, it had been rejected and had the chassis of the Type 74 tank used instead as a basis for producing the Type 87 SPAAG.

Prior to its development, tests had begun underway in 1982 with a prototype SPAAG unit manufactured in 1983.

Variants 

 AWX (1978)

The first prototype of the Type 87 that was based on a Type 61 chassis. Tests showed the weight of the turret with the radar and fire control systems was too much and so later prototypes used a Type 74 chassis.

 AWX (1983)

The second Type 87 prototype that used a Type 74 chassis. This prototype differed from the production version by a lack of smoke grenade launchers and the ability to equip a Type 92 mine roller on the front.

Status
In 2010, it was reported that the Japan Self-Defense Forces had 52 of these vehicles in service.

Operators 

 Japan Ground Self-Defense Force
  Northern Army
  2nd Division
 2nd Antiaircraft Artillery Battalion
 3rd Antiaircraft company(2 platoons: 8 vehicles)
  7th Division
 7th Antiaircraft Artillery Regiment
 1st Antiaircraft company(2 platoons: 8 vehicles)
 2nd Antiaircraft company(2 platoons: 8 vehicles)
 3rd Antiaircraft company(2 platoons: 8 vehicles)
 4th Antiaircraft company(2 platoons: 8 vehicles)
 Air Defense School
 Air Defense School Unit
 3rd Antiaircraft company(2 platoons: 8 vehicles)
 Ordnance School(Camp Tutiura）

References

External links

 Type-87 self-propelled anti-aircraft machine-gun at GlobalSecurity.org

Self-propelled anti-aircraft weapons
Anti-aircraft guns of Japan
Japan Ground Self-Defense Force
Armoured fighting vehicles of Japan
35 mm artillery
Military vehicles introduced in the 1980s